Herbert or Herb Gibbons may refer to:

 Herbert Adams Gibbons (1880–1934), an American journalist
 Herbert Gladstone Coe Gibbons (1905–1963), an English cricketer